Ares has appeared frequently in modern popular culture; he usually appears as the ancient Greek god of war in the most generally familiar classical mythology.

TV and Film
 Ares appears in Disney's Hercules and its TV spinoff, voiced by Jay Thomas.
 Ares is a regular character in the television series Xena: Warrior Princess, Hercules: The Legendary Journeys, and Young Hercules. Portrayed by Kevin Tod Smith (credited as Kevin Smith), he is scripted as a conflicted God who is torn between his passionate desire for Xena and his inherent desire to foster war and people's evil nature. The character is one of the more complex of the series. After the fall of the Olympian Gods, Ares is rendered mortal but restores his godhood along back with his sister Aphrodite after having a bite of Odin's apple through Xena's help. On the Hercules shows he was Hercules' constant antagonist. 
Ares was portrayed by Daniel Sharman in the 2011 film Immortals. During the events of the film, he, along with Athena (Isabel Lucas), Poseidon (Kellan Lutz), Apollo (Corey Sevier), and Heracles (Steve Byers), are warned by Zeus (Luke Evans) not to interfere in mortal affairs as gods unless the Titans are released. However, Ares ends up defying Zeus and directly intervenes to save Theseus (Henry Cavill) from Hyperion's men, after which he and Athena provide Theseus and his companions with horses in order to reach Mount Tartarus, where the Titans have been imprisoned. However, Zeus arrives and, in a fit rage, kills Ares for disobeying him. Zeus then tells Theseus and his allies to let Ares' death be a warning to both the gods and them that they will receive no more help from the gods and he must justify the faith Zeus has in him alone.
 In the short-lived television series Valentine, Ares was a businessman who went by the name Ari.  Initially, he was the villain of the series.  He indirectly threatened Kate, refused to give Grace a divorce, and had an antagonistic relationship with Ray.  However, he had a positive, albeit awkward, relationship with his son, Danny.  As the series progressed, Ari's relationship with Grace improved and he was charged with finding a weapon for his father.  Unfortunately, in a battle against Bastet for that weapon, Ari was fatally wounded. Greg Ellis portrayed Ari and appeared in all eight episodes that aired. 
 Ares was portrayed by Edgar Ramirez in the Wrath of the Titans, sequel of Clash of the Titans.
 Ares is the main antagonist and is voiced by Alfred Molina in the 2009 animated film, Wonder Woman.
 Ares is the main antagonist and is portrayed by David Thewlis in the DC Extended Universe film, Wonder Woman.
 Naga Ray/Hebitsukai Silver in Uchu Sentai Kyuranger is based on Ares.
 Ares is one of the main antagonists in the Netflix series Blood of Zeus.

Books and Comics
The "Ares Program" consisted of scientific missions to Mars, created by NASA, in the 2011 novel The Martian by Andy Weir.
In Planet Comics there was a strip called Mars God of War, featuring a character based on Ares under his Roman alter ego Mars. This character was a villain who took over people's bodies in various attempts to cause war.
 A bat named Ares, who is a skilled combatant, is a main character in the book series The Underland Chronicles by Suzanne Collins.
In John C. Wright's Chronicles of Chaos, he is a major character, an influential faction to be appeased when dealing with the children.
Ares is a character in both DC Comics and Marvel Comics.
Ares is a side character in the webcomic Lore Olympus, making his first appearance in episode 82.
 Ares is the name given to the second spaceship to land on the planet Mars, in Patrick Moore's science fiction novel, Mission to Mars (novel). 
 In the Percy Jackson book series, Ares is a major antagonist in the first novel, Percy Jackson and the Lightning Thief and a supporting character in the rest of the series. He, later, reappears as Mars in the spin-off series, Heroes of Olympus, and is revealed to be the father of one of the main characters, Frank Zhang. In the feature film Percy Jackson & the Olympians: The Lightning Thief, he is portrayed by Ray Winstone.

Video games
Ares is one of the Gods which appear in the Zeus: Master of Olympus and, also, in its expansion pack, Poseidon: Master of Atlantis.
Ares is an eligible character in Age of Mythology when advancing to the Classical Age. Doing so by choosing Ares as patron god provides enhancements for infantry units, the power of pestilence (by which enemy buildings cannot produce units for a period of time) and the mythical cyclops units.
Ares is also the final boss in Spartan: Total Warrior.
Ares is the main antagonist, and final boss battle, in the 2005 video game God of War. In it, Ares runs amok and assails the city of Athens while challenging the other gods and looking for Pandora's Box to maximize his power; the other gods enlist the aid of a Spartan named Kratos (the player), former protégé of Ares, who was tricked by the god to slay his family in the past. Since Zeus forbids the gods to fight each other, Kratos searches for Pandora's Box, which gives him the power to rival a god. Ares is slain by Kratos, who takes his position as "God of War".
Ares reappears in the sequel God of War II during a flashback near the beginning. His remains are then seen in God of War III as one of Kratos' battles takes place over Ares' ice tomb. 
Ares also appears in a flashback in God of War: Ghost of Sparta where it is shown that he kidnapped Kratos' brother Deimos as a prophecy foretold the demise of Olympus was to come by a marked warrior. Zeus and Ares believed the warrior to be Deimos because of his unusual birthmark, but the prophecy actually referred to Kratos, as he marked himself with a tattoo in the shape of his brother's birthmark to honor him.
Ares then appeared in God of War: Ascension, a prequel to the entire series, where it is revealed that he entered into an alliance with the Furies to overthrow Zeus and the reason he became Kratos' mentor was so that Kratos would help him conquer Olympus. Ares also had a son, Orkos, with the Fury Queen Alecto who he disowned due to not being able to meet his standards, which is also the reason why he chose to mentor Kratos instead. 
Ares also appears in Ascension's multiplayer mode as one of the four gods that players can pledge their allegiance to.
Ares is featured in the tie-in comic series (2010–11) where he entered into a wager with five other Olympian gods. Each god chose a champion to seek for the Ambrosia of Asclepius (an elixir with magical healing properties), with Ares' champion being Kratos (unbeknownst to Kratos).
Ares is a playable character in the multiplayer online battle arena Smite. He is a melee tank and is nicknamed "the God of War".
Ares is a playable fighter in Injustice: Gods Among Us.
Ares (アレス Aresu, Aless in the Japanese version) is a character from Fire Emblem: Genealogy of the Holy War. He is the son of Eldigan and Grahnye, and is the inheritor of the Demon Sword Mystletainn
Ares (アレス, Ἄρης) is a playable character in Koei Tecmo's Warriors Orochi 4. In the Warriors Orochi series, Ares follows his father to Orochi's dimensional realm. His personality is arrogant and prideful. Ares is highly confident of his own strength and looks down on humans for their perceived weaknesses. His weapon is Typhon Spears.
Ares appears in the 2020 video game Hades. He offers boons to aid the player playing Zagreus, son of Hades.
Ares appears in the mobile game Fate/Grand Order as an ally against the Crypters and Zeus in the second part of the fifth Lostbelt, the Atlantic Lostbelt, where is also revealed the original 12 Greek Gods (Ares included) were, in reality, spacefaring ships destroyed by Sefar 12,000 years ago.
 Featured in SMITE as a playable Greek god of either evil or good.

Music
In pop music English band Bloc Party recorded a song "Ares" on their third album Intimacy. 
Japanese pop artist Gackt has a song named Ares on his second solo album, Mars (album).
Musician in the hip-hop industry is named "Ares"

Science
Ares is the name of NASA's transport ship replacing the Space Shuttle, an extension of NASA's uses of Saturn for crewed rockets, Mercury for satellite programs, and the Apollo program, rather than as any reflection of the intrinsic nature of the war god.

Sports

 In Greece there are many sports clubs which are called Aris (Άρης=Ares). The most famous of them is Aris Thessaloniki. The club, also, has the God Ares as its emblem.

See also

References 

Classical mythology in popular culture
Ares
Ares in popular culture
Greek and Roman deities in fiction